Albela Sajan Aayo Re is a classical Hindi song popularized by Ustad Sultan Khan of Indore gharana in the early 1970s. Ustad Sultan Khan sang it in the Bollywood movie, Hum Dil De Chuke Sanam along with Shankar Mahadevan and Kavitha Krishnamurthy. It was also sung by the Mekaal Hasan Band and featured in their 2009 Album, Saptak. It was again recreated for the Sanjay Leela Bhansali film Bajirao Mastani and was sung by various singers. The song is based on Raag Ahir bhairav.

References

Hindi songs
Kavita Krishnamurthy songs